Phocaean red slip (PRS) is a category of terra sigillata, or "fine" Ancient Roman pottery produced in or near the ancient city of Phokaia in Asia Minor. It is recognizable by its thin reddish slip over a fine fabric, often with occasional white (lime) inclusions. The main period of production is the late 4th century AD into the 7th century, contemporary to the later production of African red slip. All forms are open bowls or dishes. Later forms have stamped decoration.

The most widely used typology was defined by John Hayes in his book Late Roman Pottery, where the ware is called "Late Roman C" according to the name given by Frederick Waagé in his publication of the Antioch excavations. The supplement to that volume established the name "Phocaean Red Slip". Hayes form 3 and Hayes form 10 are the most widely exported forms, appearing in the western Mediterranean and also in the British Isles.

Table of Common Forms

References

 Hayes, John. (1972). Late Roman Pottery. London: British School at Rome (hardcover)
 Hayes, John. (1980). "A supplement to Late Roman Pottery". London: British School at Rome.

External links
 Phocaean Red Slip in Greek, Roman and Byzantine Pottery at Ilion

Ancient Roman culture
Ancient Roman pottery
History of İzmir Province